Hateruma-class patrol vessel is a class of PL type patrol vessels of the Japan Coast Guard. PL stands for "Patrol vessel Large", and the class name "Hateruma" is named after Hateruma-jima, the southernmost inhabited island of Japan.

Aiming at policing of Senkaku Islands, they can be a floating base for smaller patrol crafts or helicopters, so they are called "", Patrol vessel, Sea-basing capability enhanced. The lead ship of the class, Hateruma (PL61), was one of the JCG's vessels involved in the 2010 Senkaku boat collision incident, including Yonakuni (PL63) and Mizuki (PS class), both of which collided with the Chinese fishing trawler Minjinyu 5179 which was then boarded and seized.

Ships of this class are equipped with one single-mounted Mk44 Bushmaster II 30mm autocannon with laser-optical fire-control system. The 30 mm caliber autocannon is an entirely new caliber for the JCG, and it gives this class increased firepower compared with usual 1,000 ton-class patrol vessels which normally have only one manually controlled 20 mm Vulcan Gatling gun.

This class has the helicopter deck wide enough to operate with Eurocopter EC225 helicopters to airlift supplies for small patrol crafts keeping Senkaku Islands under surveillance. And the broadband SATCOM system of this class can relay video data from helicopters to the ground station or the HQ of the JCG. This class is equipped with the LIDAR system to acquire targets with high accuracy, and at the same time, this system enables them to perform search and rescue mission more safely.

The JCG had intended to build a number of ships of this design for the successor of PL-101 Shiretoko-class, but this class may not suitable for SAR mission because of the insufficient low-speed mobility. So the construction project has switched to the PL-09 Kunigami-class, utilized variant of this class.

The Shiretoko class is the older 1,000 ton-class PLs, twenty-eight ships were built in late 1970s and early 1980s. It was announced that Japan plans to transfer two of the older Shiretoko-class type patrol vessels to the Philippines Coast Guard in 2012.

Ships in the class

See also
 List of Japan Coast Guard vessels and aircraft

References

Future reading
 
 
 

Patrol vessels of the Japan Coast Guard
Patrol ship classes